Lucienne Germaine Georgette Laudré-Viel (13 November 1907 at Saint-Cloud – 24 December 2000 at Ballainvilliers) was a French athlete during the 1920s and 1930s.

Biography  
She was Outdoors national Champion of France in the long jump. at the 1926 French Athletics Championships and also for the year 1927.  She was also champion of France in the high jump in 1927 and 1928.

She participated in the 1928 Summer Olympics, finishing twelfth in the High Jump.

References

External links 
 Lucienne Laudre at the French Athletics Federation 
 

1907 births
French female long jumpers
French female high jumpers
Olympic athletes of France
Athletes (track and field) at the 1928 Summer Olympics
2000 deaths
20th-century French women